Dindoli is a zonal town in the city of Surat. Today Dindoli has grown in area and population due to amalgamation of Municipalities of Godadara and Parvat and Town panchayats of Dindoli, Kharavasa . The area is also known for its Haphazard Development due to growth of migrants in the area.

References 

Cities and towns in Surat district